We Are All Moors: Ending Centuries of Crusades against Muslims and Other Minorities  is a book by Anouar Majid, published by the University of Minnesota Press.

Although published in 2009, it is already in over 200 libraries, and has been reviewed by the academic journal DISSENT, published by the University of Pennsylvania Press.

Majid is a Moroccan-American professor of English at the University of New England in Maine.

References

2009 non-fiction books